The surname McArdle or MacArdle was the twelfth most numerous in its homeland of County Monaghan in 1970. The surname in Irish is MacArdghail, from ardghal, meaning 'high valour' or from the Irish "ardghail" meaning "tall foreigner" with roots "ard" meaning "tall" and "gail" meaning "foreigner", indicative of their original ancestor being a Viking or from Viking stock. The surname is also common in County Armagh and County Louth.

They are a branch of the McMahon's of Oriel, descendants from 'Ardghail Mor MacMahon' (Irish name: Ardghail MacBriain MacMathghamhna), who was chief of the MacMahons and King of Oriel from 1402 to 1416. They were based originally in the barony of Monaghan and a branch became sub-chiefs in County Armagh under the O'Neills of the Fews.

People with the surname
Aidan McArdle, Irish actor
Andrea McArdle, Irish-American singer and actress
Angela McArdle, American Libertarian politician
Brian McArdle (1911–2002), British doctor
J. Brian De Largie McArdle (1920–1969), Australian photojournalist, editor of Walkabout magazine
Charlotte McArdle, Chief Nursing Officer for Northern Ireland 
Dorothy Macardle, Irish author and historian
Fiachra McArdle, Irish footballer for Kildare F.C
Harry McArdle, British scientist
James McArdle, Scottish actor
John McArdle (born 1949), English actor
John J. McArdle, American psychologist
Joseph A. McArdle, Pennsylvania legislator
Kenndal McArdle, Canadian ice hockey player
L. D. McArdle, American politician
Mark McArdle, Queensland legislator
Megan McArdle, Washington-based blogger and journalist
Nick McArdle, Australian sportscaster
Pete McArdle, Irish-American long-distance runner
Peter McArdle, English artist
Peter McArdle (footballer) (born 1911), English footballer
Rory McArdle, football player for Northern Ireland and Rochdale A.F.C.
Stanley McArdle (1922–2007), British Rear Admiral in the Royal Navy

See also
McArdle Laboratory
McArdle's disease, a metabolic disease more often known as glycogen storage disease type V
Macardle Moore Brewery
McCardle
James MacArdell

References

Irish families
Surnames of Irish origin